Lifeline is an American science fiction drama series broadcast on the YouTube Red network which began October 11, 2017. It starred Zach Gilford and Sydney Park. Created by screenwriters Benjamin Freiburger and Grant Wheeler, the show tells the tale of an insurance agency that uses time travel to prevent the deaths of their clients. After the company's best agent, Conner Hooks, accidentally causes his wife's death during a save-gone-bad, he attempts to find her killer while searching for a way to travel back in time and reverse history.

The first season consisted of eight episodes. On June 4, 2018, creator Benjamin Freiburger confirmed on his Twitter account that the series would not return for a second season.

Episodes

Awards and nominations

References

External links 
 Series playlist on YouTube
 

2017 American television series debuts
2017 American television series endings
YouTube Premium original series